The 1974 United States Senate election in South Dakota was held on November 5, 1974. Incumbent Democratic U.S. Senator George McGovern, who had lost the 1972 United States presidential election to Richard Nixon ran for reelection to a third term and won despite having also lost his home state two years prior.

Primary elections 
Primary elections were held on June 4, 1974.

Democratic primary

Candidates 
 George McGovern, incumbent U.S. Senator

Results

Republican primary

Candidates 
 Barbara B. Gunderson, former Republican National Committeewoman, former Civil Service Commissioner
 Al Schock
 Leo K. Thorsness, former United States Air Force colonel and prisoner of war

Results

General election

Candidates 
 Leo K. Thorsness (R)
 George McGovern (D), incumbent U.S. Senator

Results

See also 
 1974 United States Senate elections

References

Bibliography
 
 

1974
South Dakota
United States Senate